Prageeta Sharma (born 1972) is an American poet. She is the Henry G. Lee Professor of English at Pomona College.

Life 
Sharma is the author of the poetry collections Grief Sequence (Wave Books, 2019), Undergloom (Fence Books, 2013), Infamous Landscapes (Fence Books, 2007), The Opening Question (Fence Books, 2004), which won the 2004 Fence Modern Poets Prize, and Bliss to Fill (Subpress, 2000).

Sharma is the founder of the conference Thinking Its Presence: Race, Creative Writing, Literary Studies and Art. A recipient of the 2010 Howard Foundation Award, she has taught at the University of Montana and now teaches at Pomona College.

References

External links 
Faculty page at Pomona College

Living people
American women poets
Pomona College faculty
1972 births
American women academics
21st-century American women